Dorymyrmex paranensis is a species of ant in the genus Dorymyrmex. Described by Santschi in 1922, the species is endemic to Paraguay.

References

External links

Dorymyrmex
Hymenoptera of South America
Insects described in 1922